The Cirrus and Hermes or Cirrus-Hermes are a series of British aero engines manufactured, under various changes of ownership, from the 1920s until the 1950s. The engines were all air-cooled, four-cylinder inline types, with earlier ones upright and later designs inverted.

The first Cirrus design was created for the planned de Havilland Moth light aeroplane and, when it appeared in 1925, created the market for private flying. It and its successors were widely used for private and light aircraft from that moment on.

Design and development

ADC
The Cirrus engine originated in Geoffrey de Havilland's 1924 quest for a powerplant suited to a light two-seat sports biplane which would become the de Havilland Moth. No suitable engine existed at the time combining an appropriate level of power with light weight, low cost and high reliability. The Aircraft Disposal Company, also known as Airdisco and ADC, were producing the low-cost Airdisco V8 which had been developed by Frank Halford from their large stocks of war surplus Renault V8 aero engines. The Renault had been renowned for its reliability. De Havilland realised that half of this engine would make an air-cooled four-cylinder inline engine of just the right size and at low cost. He persuaded Halford to undertake its design and development.

The cylinders, pistons, con-rods and gearing were taken from the Renault, with the valve gear based on the Airdisco, and a new five-bearing crankshaft and cast crankcase were designed. Developing  in normal flight it became the first Cirrus engine, and the first air-cooled four-cylinder inline aero engine, to go into quantity production.

The Cirrus was launched onto the market in the de Havilland Cirrus Moth, first in a long line of Moths, in 1925. The engine proved to be ideal for private light aircraft and it created a new era of private flying in the UK, in both the Cirrus Moth and other similar aircraft. It was simple enough to be understood and looked after by the private owner, while its reliability made private flying safe for the first time. Moreover it achieved these at an affordable cost.

The uprated Cirrus II, with slightly greater displacement, delivered  from 1926. Halford ended his association with ADC at the end of the year, but development continued.

Cirrus Aero Engines
As ADC began to run out of the Renault engines in 1928, Cirrus Aero Engines Limited was formed at Croydon to manufacture the Cirrus models from scratch.

Although Halford was no longer associated with it (having gone off to develop the next-generation but otherwise similar de Havilland Gipsy series), the Cirrus company continued to develop new models, with the uprated Hermes appearing in 1929. It had been developed by ADC to provide more power than even the Cirrus III. Overall slightly shorter but with much the same overall weight, it delivered .

American Cirrus Engines (ACE)

American Cirrus Engines, Inc. was a subsidiary of Allied Motor Industries, Inc. set up at Belleville, N.J. in November 1928, initially to manufacture the Cirrus III under license. Having developed the American Cirrus III engine at New Jersey, the company moved to Marysville, Michigan, where it set up production. The company became known as the A.C.E. Corporation.

A new range of  inverted engines was branded Hi-Drive and appeared under names such as the Hi-Drive Cirrus III and Hi-Drive Ensign. The Hi-Drive was supplied in direct and geared drive options, and was designed to accept a de Palma supercharger for increased performance.

In 1935 A.C.E. was taken over by Menasco, who developed the inverted engine as the Pirate, sold from 1936, and a six-cylinder derivative as the Buccaneer.

Cirrus-Hermes
The independent Cirrus-Hermes Engineering Company was formed in 1931. The Hermes models I, II, III and IV were produced ranging in power from 105 hp to 140 hp depending on type.

While the Hermes II and III were uprights like their predecessors, the Hermes II B introduced a major change with the cylinders being inverted for the first time. The resulting high propeller line allowed the top of the engine to be lowered, which significantly improved the pilot's view in a single-engined type. All subsequent models would be inverted.

By this time C. S. Napier, son of Montague Napier, had joined as technical director and engine designer. He began work on two new engines but before they could be finished the company came under new management.

Cirrus Hermes
In 1934 the company was taken over by the Blackburn Aeroplane & Motor Company and moved to Brough in Yorkshire. Napier remained technical director and, while he completed the development and initial sales of the Cirrus Minor and Cirrus Major, Blackburn kept Cirrus Hermes as a separate company (though without the hyphen in its name). Although completely new designs, they were of broadly similar layout to the previous inverted engines, with the Minor in the 70-80 hp class and the Major giving 125 hp in normal use. Coming to the market almost together in 1935, they rationalised and replaced the previous ranges.

Blackburn
Once the new Cirrus engines were established, in 1937 the company became the Cirrus Engine Division of Blackburn, which itself had been incorporated into Blackburn Aircraft Limited.

The Blackburn Cirrus Midget was a smaller version developed in 1938 but it failed to enter production.

During and after WWII Blackburn produced uprated versions of the Cirrus Minor and Major. In 1948 it introduced the Blackburn Cirrus Bombardier with fuel injection and a higher compression ratio, giving increased output.

When Blackburn Aircraft merged with General Aircraft Limited (GAL) in 1949, becoming Blackburn & General Aircraft Limited, it continued to market the Minor, Major and Bombardier range until the late 1950s.

Variants

Cirrus I
(1925)
Cirrus II
(1926)
Cirrus III
(1929) Introduced by ADC, also manufactured by Cirrus Aero Engines.
American Cirrus III
(1929) Improved variant of the Cirrus III, built under license.
American Cirrus Hi-drive 
Inverted, with direct and geared drive options.
Hermes
(1929). Later as Hermes I. Introduced by Cirrus Aero Engines, also manufactured by Cirrus-Hermes.
Hermes II
(1930).
Hermes IIB
(1932). First inverted engine
Hermes III
(1932). Upright
Hermes IV and IV A
(1930). Inverted. The Hermes IV A with opposite-handed rotation was introduced around 1934.
Cirrus Minor
(1935). Later as Cirrus Minor I. Inverted. Introduced by Cirrus Hermes, also manufactured by Blackburn.
Cirrus Minor 100 hp
(1944). Inverted.
Cirrus Minor II
(1945). Inverted.
Cirrus Major
(1935). Later as Cirrus Major I. Inverted. Introduced by Cirrus Hermes, also manufactured by Blackburn.
Cirrus Major 150 hp
Inverted.
Cirrus Major II
(1945). Inverted.
Cirrus Major III
(1945) Inverted.
Blackburn Cirrus Midget
(1938). Prototype. Not manufactured.
Blackburn Cirrus Bombardier
(1948). Fuel injection.

Applications
List from Lumsden except where noted. The list includes trial installations where a different engine was principally adopted.

Cirrus

Cirrus I

Avro Avian
Avro Baby
de Havilland DH.60 Moth
Short Mussel
Westland Widgeon

Cirrus II

Avro Avian
de Havilland DH.60 Moth
de Havilland DH.71 Tiger Moth
Piaggio P.9
Short Mussel
Westland Widgeon
Bloudek XV Lojze

Cirrus III

Avro Avian
Blackburn Bluebird
Cierva C.17
de Havilland DH.60 Moth
de Havilland DH.71 Tiger Moth
Dudley Watt D.W.2
Koolhoven FK.41
Klemm L.26
Klemm L.27
Short Mussel
Simmonds Spartan
Spartan Arrow
Westland Wessex
Westland Widgeon

Cirrus IIIA
Miles M.2 Hawk

American Cirrus Engines

Cirrus III
Great Lakes 2T-1A
Emsco B-4 Cirrus
Fairchild 24

Cirrus Hi-Drive
Fairchild 22 C7A, C7AM and C7AS
Fairchild 24 C8
Granville Gee Bee Sportster Models X and B
Great Lakes 2T-1 and -1E
Skylark Aircraft 3-95

Hermes

Hermes I

Avro Avian
Blackburn Bluebird
de Havilland DH.60 Moth
Desoutter I
Koolhoven FK.41
Koolhoven FK.42
Hawker Tomtit
Hendy 302
Parnall Elf
Saro Cutty Sark
Simmonds Spartan
Southern Martlet
Westland Wessex
Westland Widgeon

Hermes II

Avro Avian
Blackburn Bluebird
Desoutter I
Spartan Arrow
Spartan Three-Seater
Westland Widgeon

Hermes IIB

Arrow Active
BFW M.23
Klemm L.27
Koolhoven F.K.44
Koolhoven F.K.45
Spartan Three-Seater

Hermes IV

Avro 643 Cadet
Hendy 302
Miles M.2 Hawk
Percival Gull
Roe IV Triplane replica
Spartan Cruiser
Spartan Three-Seater

Hermes IVA

Avro Club Cadet
Blackburn B-2
Blackburn Segrave

Engines on display
A preserved ADC Cirrus II is on display at the Science Museum (London).
A Cirrus Hermes is on display at the EAA AirVenture Museum in Oshkosh, Wisconsin.

See also
ADC Airdisco: Previous, 8-cylinder adaptation by Halford for ADC.
List of aircraft engines
de Havilland Gipsy: Halford's subsequent new design.
Hirth HM 60: German contemporary.

References

Notes

Bibliography

 The Aviation Ancestry Database of British Aviation Advertisements 1909-1990. Cirrus advertisements (retrieved 23 April 2020).
 Gunston, Bill. World Encyclopaedia of Aero Engines. Cambridge, England. Patrick Stephens Limited, 1989. 

 Lumsden, Alec. British Piston Engines and their Aircraft. Marlborough, Wiltshire: Airlife Publishing, 2003. .
R. Cheyne Stout; "The Development of the Cirrus Engine", U.S. Air Services, Volume 14, Number 4, April 1929. pp.53-4.
 Taylor, Douglas R. Boxkite to Jet: The Remarkable Career of Frank B. Halford. Rolls-Royce Heritage Trust. 1999. .

External links

1920s aircraft piston engines
1930s aircraft piston engines
1940s aircraft piston engines
1950s aircraft piston engines
Cirrus
Cirrus